Independent Group of Benalmádena (in Spanish: Grupo Independiente de Benalmádena) is a political party in the municipality of Benalmádena, Spain. GIB is led by the mayor of the municipality, Enrique Bolín.

In the 1999 municipal elections GIB won 5,251 votes (40.93%) and eleven seats in the municipal council. It was joined by the sole Independent Liberal Group (GIL) councillor of the municipality, José Luis Fuentes.

In the 2003 municipal elections GIB got 5,995 votes (41.63%) and won 10 seats in the municipal council. It has formed a majority government together with the People's Party (PP). There have been discussion on having a joint GIB-PP list for the 2007 elections.

External links
GIB website

Political parties in Andalusia